West Virginia Route 87 is an east–west state highway located in western West Virginia. The western terminus of the route is at West Virginia Route 2 southwest of Mount Alto.

Major intersections

References

087
Transportation in Jackson County, West Virginia
Transportation in Mason County, West Virginia